Wentworth was a parliamentary constituency in South Yorkshire. Originally created in 1918 and was abolished in 1950, the name was revived when a new constituency was created from 1983 to 2010. Throughout its history, Wentworth was a safe seat for the Labour Party.

Boundaries
1918–1950: The Urban Districts of Bolton-upon-Dearne, Darfield, Dodworth, Hoyland Nether, Thurnscoe, Wath-upon-Dearne, Wombwell, and Worsborough; and parts of the Rural Districts of Barnsley, and Rotherham.

1983–2010: The Metropolitan Borough of Rotherham wards of Bramley, Ravenfield and Wickersley; Brampton, Melton and Wentworth; Dalton; Hooton Roberts and Thrybergh; Rawmarsh East; Rawmarsh West; Swinton; and Wath.

At its abolition in 2010, Wentworth constituency consisted of the northern part of the Borough of Rotherham and part of the Borough of Barnsley, and was bordered by the constituencies of Barnsley East and Mexborough, Barnsley West and Penistone, Don Valley, Rotherham, Rother Valley, and Sheffield Hillsborough.

Boundary review
Following their review of parliamentary representation in South Yorkshire, the Boundary Commission for England created an extended Wentworth constituency to include electoral wards from the Borough of Barnsley. This new Wentworth and Dearne constituency was fought for the first time at the 2010 general election.

Members of Parliament

MPs 1918–1950

MPs 1983–2010

Elections

Elections in the 2000s

Elections in the 1990s

Elections in the 1980s

Elections in the 1940s

Elections in the 1930s

Elections in the 1920s

Elections in the 1910s

See also
 List of parliamentary constituencies in South Yorkshire

Notes and references

Sources
Guardian Unlimited Politics (Election results from 1992 to the present)
http://www.psr.keele.ac.uk/ (Election results from 1951 to the present)

Politics of Barnsley
Politics of Rotherham
Constituencies of the Parliament of the United Kingdom established in 1918
Constituencies of the Parliament of the United Kingdom disestablished in 1950
Constituencies of the Parliament of the United Kingdom established in 1983
Constituencies of the Parliament of the United Kingdom disestablished in 2010
Parliamentary constituencies in Yorkshire and the Humber (historic)